X-Men: Mutant Academy is a fighting game developed by Paradox Development published by Activision. It was released for PlayStation and Game Boy Color on July 14, 2000, as a tie-in to the film X-Men, which was released on the same date. A version for the Nintendo 64 had been in development prior to the game's release, but was ultimately cancelled.

Published by Activision, X-Men: Mutant Academy is a basic fighting game that uses six buttons: three buttons for punches and three for kicks, à la Street Fighter. Due to the success of the game, it was followed by two sequels: X-Men: Mutant Academy 2 and X-Men: Next Dimension. The game's characters can be played both with their comic book costumes and their costumes from the 2000 film X-Men. Characters not present in the film were given costumes of a similar design.

Gameplay

PlayStation
X-Men: Mutant Academy on the PlayStation is a fighting game that features 3D stages, but largely adhering to the rules of 2D fighters. The main characters are a combination of classic X-Men characters and the 20th Century Fox X-Men film. Nearly every X-Men character is available, each with their own fighting moves (much like Street Fighter) and plenty of finishing moves to spice things up.

Game Boy Color
Much like its big brother, X-Men: Mutant Academy on the Game Boy Color is a fighting game. Due to obvious limitations on hardware, the stages in this version have been rendered in 2D, and the gameplay is different from the PlayStation version. In addition to Story Mode, where one player takes on all the others in consecutive fights, there is training mode, battle mode, survival mode, and a versus mode utilizing the Game Link cable. During a fight, a rage bar will slowly fill, which allows using powerful special moves that are activated through button combos.

Characters
There are ten selectable characters from the X-Men Universe, all of them selectable from the beginning in versus mode, but the four bosses must be unlocked to play as in all the other modes.

X-Men
 Cyclops
 Wolverine
 Gambit
 Storm
 Beast (only character not present in the Game Boy version)
 Phoenix (a secret character in the Game Boy version)

Bosses
 Toad
 Mystique
 Magneto
 Sabretooth

Game Boy Exclusives
 Pyro (boss character)
 Apocalypse (secret character)

Reception

The PlayStation version of X-Men: Mutant Academy received mixed-to-positive reviews by critics. However, the Game Boy Color version received mostly negative reviews. Many critics and fans criticized the Game Boy Color version for its lack of difficulty, and its similarity to Street Fighter Alpha. Despite the criticism, some praised the graphics in the game. Unlike the handheld version, the PlayStation version was widely praised for the gameplay, the enemy AI, and the graphics, but it was criticized for its similarity to Capcom video games, such as Street Fighter.

References

External links
Pardox Development page
Crawfish Interactive page
Activision, Inc. page

 
2000 video games
3D fighting games
Activision games
Cancelled Nintendo 64 games
Game Boy Color games
PlayStation (console) games
Video games set in Antarctica
Video games set in Canada
Video games set in Louisiana
Video games set in New York City
Video games set on the Moon
Multiplayer and single-player video games
Superhero video games
Crawfish Interactive games
Video games developed in the United States